The online gambling industry has seen an increase of mergers and acquisitions in recent years. This has been caused by a number of factors including saturation of the market, consolidation in fragmented markets, the repeal of PASPA in the U.S.  and a greater desire for economies of scale. Below is a list of notable deals.

2020 

William Hill proposed acquisition by Caesars Entertainment
Bet.pt acquired by GVC
Barstool Sports acquired by Penn National Gaming
Eldorado Resorts acquired Caesars Entertainment, retain Caesars Entertainment name.
The Stars Group (including Sky Betting & Gaming) acquired by Flutter
SBTech acquired by Draftkings

2019 

 CG Technology acquired by William Hill
Stride Gaming acquired by Rank Group
Costa Bingo, City Bingo and Sing Bingo acquired by 888
Betbright acquired by 888
Adjarabet acquired by Flutter
Mr Green acquired by William Hill

2018 

 Neds.com.au (Australia) acquired by GVC
FanDuel acquired by Paddy Power Betfair
 Sky Bet acquired by The Stars Group
 Ladbrokes Coral acquired by GVC
 Crystalbet acquired by GVC
 William Hill Australia acquired by The Stars Group
 Crownbet acquired by The Stars Group
 IPS acquired by LeoVegas

2017 

 Tabcorp merger with Tatts Group 
Mondogoal acquired by Global Daily Fantasy Sports
 Royal Panda acquired by LeoVegas 
 NYX acquired by Scientific Games 
 Forbet acquired by Fortuna 
 Winga.it acquired by LeoVegas 
 RCS Gaming (gazzabet.it) acquired by Sportpesa 
 Football Pools acquired by OpCapita
 Touchbet acquired by Sporting Index
 NetplayTV acquired by Betsson
 Premier Casino acquired by Betsson
 32Red acquired by Kindred Group
 Dansk Underholding Limited acquired by Mr Green
 Draft acquired by Paddy Power Betfair
 Hattrick Sports Group acquired by Fortuna

2016 

 Betfair merged with Paddy Power (now Flutter Entertainment)
 Ladbrokes merged with Gala Coral (now Ladbrokes Coral)
 Bwin Party acquired by GVC
 Sisal acquired by CVC Capital Partners
 Tipico (majority stake) acquired by CVC Capital Partners
 Best Gaming Technology (BGT) acquired by Playtech
 Grand Parade acquired by William Hill
SBAT acquired by Catena Media
 Open Bet acquired by NYX Gaming
 Inspired Gaming acquired by Hydra Industries (renamed Inspired Entertainment Inc)
 TonyBet acquired by Betsson

2015 

 Sky Betting and Gaming (majority stake) acquired by CVC Capital Partners
 International Game Technology acquired by GTECH (later renamed IGT)
 Chartwell and Cryptologic (sold by Amaya) acquired by NYX Gaming
 HRTV (now TVG2) acquired by Betfair
 Stan James acquired by Unibet
 Gala Bingo (sold by Gala Coral) acquired by Caledonia Investments plc
 iGame Group acquired by Unibet
 Yoyo Games acquired by Playtech

2014 

 Rational Group (PokerStars) acquired by Amaya
 Probability Plc acquired by GTECH
 Betstar acquired by Ladbrokes
 Oranje Casino and Kroon Casino acquired by Betsson

2013 

 Betdaq acquired by Ladbrokes
 Gaming Investments (Bookmaker.com.au) acquired by Ladbrokes
Tom Waterhouse acquired by William Hill
 Centrebet and Sportingbet (Australia) acquired by William Hill
 Sportingbet acquired by GVC. 
Blue Square acquired by Betfair
 Gala Casinos acquired by Rank Group

2012 

 American Wagering Inc acquired by William Hill
 Cryptologic acquired by Amaya
 Nordic Betting (Bet24) acquired by Unibet
 Ongame (sold by Bwin) acquired by Amaya

2011 

 PartyGaming merged with Bwin (to create Bwin.Party)
 Centrebet acquired by Sportingbet
 Betsafe acquired by Betsson
 Cayetano acquired by Paddy Power

2010 

 Sportsbet.com.au acquired by Paddy Power
 Virtue Fusion acquired by Playtech

2009 

 TVG acquired by Betfair
 World Poker Tour (WPT) acquired by Party Poker

2008 

 Betterbet.com acquired by Stan James

2007 
 Oddschecker acquired by BSkyB (now Sky Betting and Gaming)
 Sponsio acquired by Ladbrokes
 Maria Holdings acquired by Unibet

2006 
 Bowmans.com acquired by Bet365
 GTECH acquired by Lottomatica (later renamed GTECH)
 Timeform acquired by Betfair

2005 
 Gala merged with Coral Eurobet (to create Gala Coral)
 PokerChamps.com acquired by Betfair
 Ongame acquired by Bwin

2004 

 Casino Club acquired by GVC

2003 
 Blue Square acquired by Rank

2001 
 Flutter.com merged with Betfair

2000 
 Sports Internet Group acquired by BSkyB (now Sky Betting and Gaming)

See also 
 List of corporate mergers
 :Category:Gambling companies of the United Kingdom
 :Category:Mergers and acquisitions

References 

.
online gambling